The Adhafer-class corvette is a type of stealth corvette belonging to the Algerian Navy. They are built in China by China State Shipbuilding Corporation CSSC in its Hudong-Zhonghua shipyard in Shanghai. Three Adhafer-class ships were commissioned, with an option for three others of the same type. The first unit was launched on 15 August 2014 and commissioned in November 2015. The second and third were both commissioned in 2016.

Design 
The displacement of the Adhafer-class corvette is about 2,880 tons standard and 3,000 tons full load. The propulsion system consists of four MTU diesel engines.

The ship features a "low point" design and combines this with radar absorbing paint to reduce radar signature. In a departure from existing designs, there is no funnel stack. Instead, the diesels exhaust near the waterline to minimise infrared signatures. The hull has two sets of fin stabilisers as well as bilge keels.

Combat system 

The Adhafer class's combat system is largely Chinese with the exception of the Thales Smart-S Mk2, associated multifunction operator consoles (MOC)/Tacticos cluster, Link Y datalinks, and associated consoles. Four or so MOC for the Smart-S are integrated with a CSTC-supplied combat management system (CMS).

Armament 
The ships are equipped with an Italian 76 mm NG-16-1 naval cannon as their main gun, inside a turret with a reduced radar cross-section design. They may engage surface targets as well as aircraft.

The Adhafer class carries HQ-7 naval short-range air defence missiles in eight-cell FM90 launcher. The missile's operating altitude is 15~6,000 m and a range of 700 m to 15 km, it offers combined guidance by command and electro-optical tracking.

The ship also carries C-802A anti-ship missiles in two quad launchers, which can target ships within the range of 280 km, and two triple 324 mm torpedo launchers. Two seven-barrel 30 mm Type 730 CIWS, both mounted atop the hangar, provide close-in defence. Each gun has a maximum rate of fire of 4,600~5,800 rounds/min.

Electronic countermeasures 
The digital and solid state Type 726-4 decoy launcher system is mounted on the side of the ship and consists of two launchers. Each launcher has 18 tubes arranged in three six-tube rows. Firing is typically controlled automatically by the combat data system, but a manual control console is also provided.

The primary role of the Type 726-4 is to launch chaff and decoys. However, atypically, it may also fire ASW rockets (against submarines, torpedoes, and frogmen), and can also be used for shore bombardment.

The Adhafer-class corvette also carries an ESM system.

Sensors 

The ships are equipped with Smart-S Mk2 medium to long-range air and surface surveillance 3D multibeam PESA radar designed by Thales Nederland, with a maximum range of 250 km. Two navigation radars - an I-band (X-band) set and an E/F-band (S-band) set - that are thought to be Kelvin Hughes SharpEye radars. In addition of Type 364 targeting and secondary air search radar. One Type 345 fire-control radar system used to guide the FM90N missiles. Two Type 347 fire-control radars control the Type 730 CIWS. They are also equipped with a hull-mounted sonar of Chinese origin.

Ships

New version 
On 22 November 2016, the 9th IDEAS (International Defense Exhibition and Seminar) opens its doors at the Karachi Exhibition Center in Pakistan. In the Chinese pavilion, the Chinese naval group CSSC came up with the model of a new stealth frigate that would be called C28A. Brings together a radar with AESA quad faces and a part of sensors of the building, complemented by a second located just behind and equipped with systems of watch and EW diversified. This is the most notable point of this frigate proposed by the CSSC. These two PJ-12B model gun CIWS mounted at the rear of the old C28A hangar are now positioned a little further forward but still remain above the hangar. The whole is reinforced by the new CIWS missile FL-3000N of 15 or 24 tubes, whose missiles are equipped with a search head of mixed guidance in passive radar and infrared.

"Hard Kill" for the anti-aircraft defense have been greatly improved compared to the old model. Other views extracted from a CCTV report show that the "new" C28A keeps its 8 anti-ship missiles on Launch ramp, which could be either the C802A or the C803. A standard lure maker that resembles the Model 726-4 is installed on each side.

References 

Corvette classes
Corvettes of the Algerian National Navy
Ships built in China